Gordon Jones (born July 25, 1957) is a former professional American football player who played wide receiver for five seasons for the Tampa Bay Buccaneers and Los Angeles Rams.

College career
Jones was recruited out of East Allegheny high school to play for Johnny Majors and the University of Pittsburgh. The Pitt Panthers of the late 1970's were one of the top programs in the country and some of those players, besides Jones, that would go one to NFL careers include Tony Dorsett, and Matt Cavanaugh. In 1975, Jones played in 12 games, he caught 22 passes for 384 yards and four touchdown passes.  That season, Pittsburgh finished ranked 15th in the national and defeated Kansas in the Sun Bowl. 1976 proved to be an odd year stats wise for Jones. He caught one less pass, but for one more yard and one more touchdown than he'd had the previous season.

1977 was a break out year for Jones. He finished 5th in the national with 45 receptions. His nine touchdown receptions also put him in the top ten in the nation, as he finished seventh. He also had four kick off returns for a touchdown, which put him at number one. He also played in the Gator Bowl, as Pittsburgh crushed Clemson 34-3. In Jones' senior year, he again caught 45 passes, this time for 666 yards and just three touchdown receptions.

Pro career
The Tampa Bay Buccaneers selected Jones in the second round on the 1979 NFL draft (34th player selected overall). Much of Jones' rookie season was spent on the bench, as he was buried on the depth chart by Morris Owens, Larry Mucker and Isaac Hagins, the team's seasons vets. Jones only started one game, and finished the season with four receptions for 80- yards and one touchdown. He played in the NFC Championship against the Los Angeles Rams, but did not catch a pass. The next season Tampa Bay overhauled their receiving core. Owens was let go, and rookie Kevin House took his place on the roster. Jones started in 14 games, caught 48 passes for 668 yards and five touchdowns, in what be his best season as a pro. With Kevin House emerging as the go to receiver for Tampa Bay, Jones settled into the role as the number two receiver. He started few games over the next two seasons, as Gerald Carter (acquired from the Jets) and Theo Bell, acquired from the Pittsburgh Steelers reduced Jones' workload. After the 1982 season, was finished, Jones moved on from Tampa Bay to play for the Rams. Jones caught 11 passes for 172 yards for the Rams, but the offense was centered around running back Eric Dickerson.

Post NFL career
As of 2011, Gordon Jones had returned to the city of Tampa and worked as a Respiratory Therapist.

References

1957 births
Living people
American football wide receivers
Los Angeles Rams players
Tampa Bay Buccaneers players
Pittsburgh Panthers football players
Players of American football from Buffalo, New York